Robert Timms (born ) is a compound archer from Australia.

Robert Timms competed at the 2010 Commonwealth Games, finishing 6th, and has  represented Australia at the highest level World Archery Federation competitions, including the FITA Archery World Cup and the World Archery Championships. In 2007 he placed 9th at the World Archery Championships and 2nd in the Teams Event. In 2008 he placed 2nd at the World Cup stage 1 in Dominican Republic.   In 2015 he placed 9th at the 2015 World Archery Championships. He was the Australian Open Champion in 2014 and 2015.

References

1980 births
Living people
Australian male archers
Place of birth missing (living people)